Qareh Tappeh (also known as Qeshlāq-e Qareh Tappeh) is a village in Tazeh Kand Rural District, Khosrowshahr District, Tabriz County, East Azerbaijan Province, Iran. At the 2006 census, its population was 436, in 120 families.

References 

Populated places in Tabriz County